Paulo Junior may refer to:

 Paulo Jr. (born 1969), full name Paulo Xisto Pinto Júnior, Brazilian bassist for the band Sepultura
 Paulo Júnior (footballer, 1984-2018), full name Paulo Roberto Morais Júnior, Brazilian football striker
 Paulo Jr. (footballer) (born 1989), full name Paulo Morais de Araújo Júnior, Brazilian football forward
 Paulo Junior (footballer, born April 2000), full name Luis Paulo Silva Junior, Brazilian football defender
 Paulo Junior (footballer, born October 2000), full name Paulo Junior dos Santos Gomes, Cape Verdean football midfielder